"Panchi Nadiya Pawan Ke" is a 2000 Hindi song from the film Refugee. The track is composed by Anu Malik with lyrics by Javed Akhtar. It was sung by Sonu Nigam and Alka Yagnik and picturised on Abhishek Bachchan and Kareena Kapoor.

Awards and recognitions
Sonu Nigam and Alka Yagnik both were nominated for Filmfare Award for Best Male and Best Female Playback Singer respectively, eventually Sonu losing it to Lucky Ali for "Na Tum Jano Na Hum" (Kaho Naa... Pyaar Hai). But Alka Yagnik won the award this year for "Dil Ne Yeh Kaha Hain Dil Se" (Dhadkan). However, Anu Malik won both the National Film Award for Best Music Direction and the Filmfare Special Jury Award for the entire soundtrack album. Javed Akhtar won both the National Film Award for Best Lyrics and the Filmfare Award for Best Lyricist.

See also
 Refugee (2000 film)
 Anu Malik
 Sonu Nigam
 Alka Yagnik
 Abhishek Bachchan
 Kareena Kapoor

References

Indian songs
Hindi film songs
2000 songs
Sonu Nigam songs
Songs with lyrics by Javed Akhtar
Songs with music by Anu Malik